The 1995 Cronulla-Sutherland Sharks season was the 29th in the club's history. They competed in the ARL's 1995 Winfield Cup premiership.

Ladder

Auckland Warriors were stripped of 2 competition points due to exceeding the replacement limit in round 3.

References

Cronulla-Sutherland Sharks seasons
Cronulla-Sutherland Sharks Season